Dinagat, officially the Municipality of Dinagat (Surigaonon: Lungsod nan Dinagat;), is a 5th class municipality in the province of Dinagat Islands, Philippines. According to the 2020 census, it has a population of 10,621 people.

History
Founded under the order of Governor-General Manuel Crespo as a pueblo in April 25, 1855, the municipality is the oldest of the whole province. Settlers from Leyte, Bohol, and Surigao built their homes along the coast of what is now the poblacion of the town. According to sources, the first families to settle in the town were Ga, Ventura, Ecunar, Gealogo, Jarligo, Geraldino,Ensomo, Gier, and Eviota. However the pueblo is on constant risk of being attacked by Moro pirates from mainland Mindanao. It even reached to the point that they managed to steal the bell of the Immaculada Concepion Parish, the only church in the town then, and dumped it in a well situated on what is now sitio Busay in Barangay New Mabuhay. But the Moro pillaging was eventually stopped by the first gobernadorcillo of the town, Pedro Ga Ventura, along with his brother Leon through estukada or fencing using linantip, a variety of bolo.  They were considered by local historians as the first hero of the whole province.

The population of the town began to rapidly grow after World War II. The local economy flourished and birth rates were high with more people coming from Surigao coming to the town to settle down. Elementary and secondary schools were built in the area and later on ports and improved infrastructures were also built in the town.

The town became more populous than ever after the foundation of the Philippine Benevolent Missionaries Association, headed by the Ruben Edera Ecleo Sr, which also served as a mayor of Dinagat from 1963 to 1987. The influx of settlers, mostly PBMA members, caused a rapid rise in population. However, many of those settlers did not live at the town centre, rather at Sitio Puyangi, which would become the Municipality of San Jose, Dinagat Islands today.

Due to their areas being developed, Barangay San Jose, Matingbe, Jacques, Aurelio, Mahayahay, San Juan, Don Ruben Ecleo, Justiniana Edera, Santa Cruz, Cuarenta, Wilson and Luna was separated from the original territory of Dinagat to form the new municipality of San Jose on November 15, 1989, under Republic Act No. 6769.

The town became a part of the province of Dinagat Islands in December 2006, when the province was created from Surigao del Norte by Republic Act No. 9355. However, in February 2010, the Supreme Court ruled that the law was unconstitutional, as the necessary requirements for provincial land area and population were not met. The town reverted to Surigao del Norte. On October 24, 2012, however, the Supreme Court reversed its ruling from the previous year, and upheld the constitutionality of RA 9355 and the creation of Dinagat Islands as a province.

Geography
The municipality is generally hilly with towering mountainous in eastern side part and islands outlying in the western part. Plain areas are located within the vicinity of different creeks and rivers that flow to the western coast (majority of the plains are located in Magsaysay, Cayetano, and Wadas) and are used for agricultural purposes with products being rice, maize, and cassava. The poblacion or the town centre is located on the western end of the Dinagat Peninsula separated by the Dinagat Bay on the north and Awasan bay on the south.  It has many pockets of beaches on its coast mainly on the islands of Cab-Ilan and Cabayawan but beaches are also spotted in White Beach, Wadas, and Gomez. La isla Calaveras (Pulo), an island near Tagbuyakhaw, was used as a mass grave for people killed by brutal Japanese occupiers during World War II. But now it became an attraction for beach goers. Mangroves dominate the deltas and wetlands of the coasts and are prevalent in New Mabuhay, Wadas, Magsaysay, and Cayetano. Aquaculture is lively as it has many protected fish sanctuaries in the bay.

Barangays
Dinagat is politically subdivided into 12 barangays.
 Bagumbayan 
 Cab-ilan
 Cabayawan 
 Cayetano 
 Escolta (Poblacion)
 Gomez (with Tagbuyakhaw as a sitio)
 Magsaysay 
 Mauswagon (Poblacion)
 New Mabuhay 
 Wadas 
 White Beach (Poblacion)

Climate

The town generally experiences dry season from April to October along with wavy seas due to the Habagat (Southwestern Monsoon)  and wet season from November to March.

Demographics

Economy

Gallery

References

External links
 Dinagat Profile at the DTI Cities and Municipalities Competitive Index
 [ Philippine Standard Geographic Code]

Municipalities of Dinagat Islands